Campbell's fairywren (Chenorhamphus campbelli) is a species of bird in the Australasian wren family, Maluridae. It is found in New Guinea. It is found in south-central and south-eastern New Guinea in its natural habitat of subtropical or tropical moist lowland forests.

Taxonomy and systematics
Formerly, this species was lumped with the broad-billed fairywren in the genus Malurus until a 2011 analysis of mitochondrial and nuclear DNA showed high divergence between the two subspecies resulting in them being re-split into separate species. The study also found them to lie in a clade with the genera Sipodotus and Clytomyias leading to their subsequent re-classification in their own genus, Chenorhamphus. The species is named after Rob Campbell, of Dunfermline, Scotland, who identified it during his time in Papua New Guinea in the 1980s.

References

Campbell's fairywren
Birds of New Guinea
Campbell's fairywren